The first season of Burmese competitive reality TV cooking show MasterChef Myanmar ran from September 9, 2018 to January 20, 2019 on MRTV-4. Tin Tin Oo was the winner of this season. The host of this season was Kaung Htet Zaw and the judges were Michel Louis Meca, U Ye Htut Win and Daw Phyu Phyu Tin.

Top 20

References

Burmese television series
MasterChef
MasterChef Myanmar